The 2013 Isle of Wight Council election was held on 2 May 2013 to elect all 40 members for a four-year term to the Isle of Wight Council, a unitary authority which governs the Isle of Wight. Going into the election, the Conservative Party was looking to gain a third term in power after first being elected to overall control in 2005, but in one of the shock results of the wider local elections being held in the country, the Conservatives lost overall control of the council, having been reduced to 15 seats, 6 short of a majority of 21. The 'Island Independents', a mutually supporting group of candidates and councillors running as independents, gained the same number of seats, whilst other independents, UKIP, Labour, and a Liberal Democrat made up the remainder.

Emblematic of the election, the Conservative leader of the council, David Pugh, lost his own seat to an Island Independent. The popular perception of the reasons for the Conservative losses was, in the words of OnTheWight, 'It's widely thought that the way they implemented the financial cuts turned the Island against them. Particularly unpopular was the wholesale closing of the Tourist Information centres and public toilets.' With neither the Conservatives or the Island Independents gaining a majority outright, control of the authority was initially in doubt, but on 8 May the Island Independents announced the five non-aligned independents would be joining their group.

Background

Leading into the 2005 council election, the Liberal Democrats and its predecessors had been in power on the island since 1981,  albeit since 2001 in coalition with a group of independents.  However, public opposition to a school closure program by the council led to the rout of the Liberal Democrats, and the election of the Conservatives to take over.  Education remained a major issue as the Conservatives under Council Leader David Pugh sought re-election in 2009, with plans to redress problems caused by the island's unusual three-tier education structure having elicited further controversy – and the resignation of several Conservative councillors in protest – and a sluggish economy with unemployment higher than the average of South East England playing against the party as well. In the end, the Conservatives won re-election, but held only 24 seats, a drop of 9 since the last election, although a boundary review had led to the abolition of 8 seats. Behind them, independents made up the next largest contingent on the council, winning 10 seats, whilst the Liberal Democrats failed to make headway.

Campaign
As the 2013 campaign started, education remained a top issue. Though the three-tier system had been abolished in favour of two tiers, three of the island's six secondary schools were judged 'inadequate' by Ofsted. Simon Perry, editor of OnTheWight, remarked to the BBC that education was the single biggest priority for voters. In addition, the council agreed to transfer some of its education powers to Hampshire County Council, despite not being under its jurisdiction; and problems over education were further amplified for the Conservatives when the chief executive of the council, Steve Benyon, departed controversially after the Ofsted inspections. Beyond this local issue was the impact of national politics: the Conservatives were into their third year of governing the United Kingdom in coalition with the Liberal Democrats, implementing unpopular austerity measures and fending off challenges from Labour on the left and UKIP on the right.  Cuts to local government forced the council to implement their own cost-saving measures, which included closing public toilets and tourist information centres.

The Conservatives campaigned on working with the private sector to improve the local economy, and minimising future council tax rises.  The Island Independents – a group of mutually-supporting candidates and councillors standing as independents – pledged to create a more transparent administration that worked more with islanders on decision-making.  Their campaign was launched by former independent MP Martin Bell. Labour focused its campaign on improving facilities for disabled people, including trying to repair the council's relationship with the disabled-orientated Riverside Centre, and working to prevent schools on the island from becoming academies; the Liberal Democrats, meanwhile, promised to invest more into children's services and to start an affordable housing program. UKIP, trying to enter the council for the first time, pledged to re-open public toilets and tourist information centres, campaign for a grammar school, protect the Frank James Hospital, and allow their councillors to vote without a party whip.

The election in the Shanklin South ward, held by Pugh, soon became the most high-profile battle of the campaign. Facing Pugh was Richard Priest, manager of the Riverside Centre and a town councillor, standing as an Island Independent. Fearful of splitting the anti-Pugh vote and sensing Priest had the best chance of defeating Pugh, Labour and UKIP decided not to field candidates in the ward. Meanwhile, the continuing decline of the Liberal Democrats on the island became more evident during the campaign. Aside from their local problems since their last stint in power, the national party had been battered by its involvement in government with the Conservatives. Bob Blezzard, a high-profile Liberal Democrat on the island, resigned from the party in 2012 and publicly denounced his national party leader, Nick Clegg, before announcing he would stand as an independent candidate to the council for Sandown North. Former council leader, Shirley Smart, likewise decided to resign from the party and stand as an independent in Newport South. Neither aligned themselves with the Island Independents. In the end, the Liberal Democrats were only able to field seven candidates, with group leader Reg Barry saying it was a 'shame' that Blezzard and Smart, among others, 'have turned their back'. The UKIP campaign ran into some difficulty when they were accused by the Conservatives of falsifying signatures on the electoral nomination forms of their candidate for Newport North – the police were unable to give judgement on the complaint before the election.

Results
With all ward results declared on the day after the election, the Conservatives had lost their majority on the council. After winning 24 seats in 2009, with a majority of 4, the party ended up with 15 seats, 6 short of overall control – a net loss of 9 seats. The Island Independents, on the other hand, won 15 seats as well. UKIP gained representation on the council for the first time, winning 2 seats, whilst Labour reclaimed Lake North, lost in 2009. The Liberal Democrats achieved their worst result on the island since the party's formation, holding onto only Reg Barry's seat. Blezzard and Smart, however, were elected as independents, as were another three candidates who were also not aligned with the Island Independents. The most notable result though, was Pugh's defeat to Priest by only 10 votes. Without a seat on the council, Pugh lost its leadership, and that of the Conservative group – on 7 May, Cllr Dave Stewart was chosen to replace Pugh as leader of the group. After his election defeat, Pugh remarked 'Clearly I'm disappointed. It's been a privilege to serve the island.'

With neither the Conservatives or the Island Independents winning a majority outright, both sides vied to win the support of other councillors to form their own administration. On 8 May, the Island Independents announced that the five other independents had joined their group. The next election to the council was held in May 2017 and led to the Conservatives regaining control of the council.

References

2013 English local elections
2013
21st century on the Isle of Wight